East Loch Tarbert, Argyll is a small sea loch on the eastern side of the Kintyre peninsula in Scotland. It is a part of the much larger Loch Fyne.

According to Snorri Sturluson's Heimskringla, Magnus Barefoot, King of Norway, had his longship dragged across this isthmus as part of a campaign to increase his possessions in the Hebrides. He made an arrangement with King Malcolm III of Scotland that he could take possession of land on the west coast around which a ship could sail. Magnus declared that Kintyre had "better land than the best of the Hebrides", and by taking command of his ship's tiller and "sailing" across the isthmus he was able to claim the entire  peninsula, which remained under Norse rule for more than a dozen years as a result.

More than two centuries later Robert the Bruce completed a similar feat during the Scottish Wars of Independence in order to impress the clan chieftains of Argyll. He used tree trunks as rollers.

James Watt surveyed the area and decided that it was feasible to construct a canal between the two lochs. Some 60 years later it was estimated that the cost for a cut without locks would be £90,000 but delays in implementation and the construction of the Crinan canal in 1801 rendered the plan redundant.

In the modern era the Tarbert (Loch Fyne) Harbour Commissioners control the loch, an area defined as "from the point of Garvell on the North, to the Oakenhead or Rudha Loigste point on the South". There are various quays and slipways in the inner harbour and 80 pontoon berths for yachts and other leisure craft.

References
Murray, W.H. (1977) The Companion Guide to the West Highlands of Scotland. London. Collins.
Hollander, Lee M. (ed. & tr.) (1964) Heimskringla: History of the Kings of Norway. Austin: University of Texas Press.

Footnotes

Sea lochs of Scotland
Lochs of Argyll and Bute